Kalpana (Bengali: কল্পনা; English: Imagination) is a famous Bengali language poetry book written by Rabindranath Tagore. It was published in 1900. It consists of 49 poems. He had included 1 poem of "Kalpana" in his Nobel Prize winning work Song Offerings.

Dedication 
Tagore dedicated the book to Shrishchandra Majumder. He was Tagore's friend.

List of poems 
The poems of "Kalpana" include:

 Chourapanchashika
 Madanbhasmer purbe
 Madanbhasmer par
 Spardha
 Bhrasta lagna
 Bangalakhhi
 Bhikhhayang noiba noiba cha
 Se amar janani re
 Jachana
 Nababiraha
 Manaspratima
 Sakaruna
 Prakash
 Biday
 Asomoy
Boishakh
Janmadiner gaan
Duhsomoy
Swapna
Marjana
Piyasi
Pranayprashna
Sharat
Hatabhagyer gaan
Jagadishchandra Basu
Biday
Lajjita
Sankoch
Bibahamangal
Unnatilakhhan
Borshashes
Basanta
Ratri
Purnakam
Chaitrarajani
Pasarini
Asha
Matar ahaban
Juta-abhishkar
Bhikari
Lila
Kalpanik
Prarthi
Bharatlakhhi
Ashes
Jharer dine
Bhagna mandir
Anabachinna Ami

Parinam

References

External links 

 bn.m.wikisource.org

 rabindra-rachanabali.nltr.org

1900 poetry books
Bengali poetry collections
Poetry collections by Rabindranath Tagore
Bengali-language literature